The Bachelor Presents: Listen to Your Heart is an American dating reality television series created by Mike Fleiss for ABC. It is a spin-off of The Bachelor and is hosted by Chris Harrison. The series is produced by Next Entertainment in association with Warner Horizon Television, with Fleiss, Martin Hilton, Nicole Woods, Bennett Graebner, Peter Gust, Tim Warner, Louis Caric, and Peter Geist serving as executive producers.

Format
The series follows single men and women, who are musicians or work in the music industry, hoping to find love through music. The contestants will sing well-known songs, both individually and as couples, and explore their relationships while living together and going on Bachelor-style dates that focus on music.

Contestants
The 23 contestants were revealed on February 27, 2020.

Color key:

Future appearances
Chris Watson and Bri Stauss made their appearance on one episode in season sixteen of The Bachelorette, while performing on one of the dates to one of the contestants from that season.

Production
In January 2020, ABC announced a straight-to-series order for a new spin-off of The Bachelor franchise titled The Bachelor Presents: Listen to Your Heart. The series is produced by Next Entertainment in association with Warner Horizon Television, with Mike Fleiss, Martin Hilton, Nicole Woods, Bennett Graebner, Peter Gust, Tim Warner, Louis Caric, and Peter Geist serving as executive producers, and Chris Harrison hosting. Filming had commenced in February 2020 prior to the COVID-19 pandemic.

Episodes

Elimination table

 The contestant won the competition.
 The contestant was the runner-up of the competition.
 The contestant gave out or received a rose and was safe.
 The contestant gave out a date card and gave/received a rose.
 The contestant received a date card and gave/received a rose.
 The contestant went on a date and received a rose.
 The contestant did not receive a rose and was eliminated.
 The contestant was eliminated after their partner quit.
 The contestant quit the competition.
 The contestant went on a date but did not receive a rose and was eliminated.

Ratings

References

External links
 
 

2020 American television series debuts
2020 American television series endings
2020s American reality television series
2020s American game shows
American Broadcasting Company original programming
American dating and relationship reality television series
Listen to Your Heart
Television series by Warner Horizon Television
Television shows filmed in Los Angeles